The Nikon Z 7 is a 45.7 megapixel full-frame mirrorless interchangeable-lens camera produced by Nikon. The camera was officially announced on August 23, 2018, for release in September 2018. It was the first camera to use Nikon's new Z-mount system; the second model, released in November 2018, was the 24.5 megapixel Nikon Z 6.

Three Z-mount lenses were available by December 2018, the Nikkor Z 24-70mm f/4 S
FX AF, the 35mm f/1.8 S FX AF and the 50mm f/1.8 S FX AF. The F-to-Z mount adapter accessory allows for using Nikon lenses from the digital SLR series with full compatibility.

In late 2018, Nikon also published a "roadmap" of lenses to be released between 2019 and 2021. A total of nine products were included in that list.

The Nikon Z 7 was succeeded by the Nikon Z 7II in October 2020.

Features
 45.7 megapixel Back-illuminated sensor (BSI) CMOS sensor.
 Native ISO range of 64–25,600.
 Expeed 6 image processor.
 Nikon Z mount featuring a 55 mm throat diameter for a less divergent optical path between lens exit pupil and image sensor.
 16 mm flange distance.
 Nikon F-mount lenses will be able to be used through the Nikon FTZ lens adapter.
 493-point autofocus system that can automatically switch between phase detect auto-focus and contrast detect auto-focus. The focus points cover 90% of the viewfinder area.
 5-stop in-body image stabilization.
 Up to 9 fps continuous shooting that is also compatible with F-mount lenses when mounted with the FTZ lens adapter.
 An electronic viewfinder (EVF) with a 3.7 million dot display with a 0.8x magnification and a 37° viewing angle.
 The rear display is a 3.2" tiltable touchscreen with 2.1 million dots.
 It can record 1080p video at up to 120 fps, and 4K video at up to 30 fps. Video can be output over an HDMI connection in 10-bit N-Log for advanced external recording devices.
 The camera comes with an EN-EL15b battery, and is compatible with EN-EL15a batteries and EN-EL15 batteries.

Update history

The Z 6 and Z 7 share firmware updates with only minor differences due to the different sensors.

Reception
After completing their test of the new camera, the Digital Photography Review web site provided this conclusion: "The Nikon Z7 ... is also its most well-rounded camera for stills and video, and an exciting indicator for what's to come from the 101 year-old company. But first generation products are rarely perfect, and the Nikon Z7 is no exception". The overall score was 89%.

The positive specifics were briefly stated: "the camera feels, handles, and operates like a smaller, lighter full-frame Nikon DSLR - from button placement to menu layout, to the robustness of the build quality and the comfort of the grip. But there are some small differences, namely in the way the AF system operates. It is also the first Nikon full-framer with a truly useful silent shutter and mechanical in-body stabilization. On the cinema side it offers a wide variety of 4K video capture options that should satisfy both home-movie-makers and advanced videographers alike, but possibly not established professionals".

The site provided this summary of the less positive aspects: "the Z7 technically offers the same calculated Raw dynamic range as the D850, on sensor AF points lead to banding/striping which limits usable DR [dynamic range]. Autofocus, while reliable in good light, hunts more than we'd like as light levels drop. And AF tracking as a whole lags behind the competition, as well as Nikon's own full-frame DSLRs, both in terms of reliability and usability".

See also
Nikon Z 5
Nikon Z 6
Nikon Z 50

References

External links

Z 7
Z 7
Cameras introduced in 2018
Full-frame mirrorless interchangeable lens cameras